Blandford is a surname. Notable people with the surname include:
 Don Blandford, longtime Kentucky state legislator
 George Fielding Blandford (1829–1911), English physician and psychiatrist
 Mark Blandford (entrepreneur) (born 1957), British entrepreneur
 Mark Harden Blandford (1826–1902), American soldier, attorney, politician and judge
 Roger Blandford (born 1949), astronomer and astrophysicist
 Walter F. H. Blandford, entomologist

English toponymic surnames